The Oregon Bottle Bill is a container-deposit legislation enacted in the U.S. state of Oregon in 1971 that went into effect in October 1972. It was the first such legislation in the United States. It was amended in 2007 and 2011. It requires applicable beverages in applicable sizes in glass, plastic or metal cans or bottles sold in Oregon to be returnable with a minimum refund value. The refund value was initially 5 cents until April 1, 2017, when it increased to 10 cents. The Oregon Legislature has given the Oregon Liquor Control Commission the authority to administer and enforce the Bottle Bill. For COVID-19 related reasons, from March 15, 2020 until July 5, 2021 enforcement was suspended a few times and retailers were allowed to limit acceptance hours. Oregon Beverage Recycling Cooperative (OBRC), a private cooperative owned by retailers and beverage distributors, administers the collection and transportation of returned containers and keeps all the unclaimed deposits. Materials from returned containers are sold by the OBRC and proceeds are handed out to beverage distributors. In 2022, the bottle bill was expanded to include canned wine, which will become eligible for redemption on July 1, 2025.

When passed in 1971, the bottle bill was viewed primarily as a litter control measure. In 1971, bottles made up about 40% of litter,  10.8% in 1973 and 6% in 1979. Oregon DEQ reports that the reduction is "as a result of the law" referring to the Bottle Bill. In a 2006 publication it was reported that states without similar bills recycle on average 33% of their containers. A 2016 study by Campbell, Benjamin, et al. found bottle deposit law only had a small impact of about 3% for clear glass and aluminum recycling rate when bottle deposit law coexists with municipal recycling program. In 2015, more than 80% of Oregonians lived where curbside recycling is provided. In the same year, the Oregonian's editorial board posited that the bottle deposit has become more redundant as curbside recycling became more common. State law requires retailers and redemption centers to pay the refund value to consumers presenting containers covered under the bottle bill. Beverage distributors charge the initial deposit on shipments of beverages to retailers, who in turn pass it onto customers, however, charging deposit to consumers is not required by state law. Beverage distributors retain all deposits not reclaimed by consumers. The 2019 statewide redemption rate for containers subject to deposit was 85.8%.

Starting in the early 2010s, OLCC approved redemption centers run by distributors; there were 16 of them by April 2017. Several redemption centers have been plagued with issues revolving around transients, crime and drug activities. Community objections to redemption center proposals have revolved around these issues.

Covered beverages 
The refund value has been 10 cents since April 1, 2017 and it applies to covered beverages in cans or bottles made from metal, glass or plastic.

3 liters or less 

 Water and flavored water
 Beer or other malt beverages
 carbonated soft drinks.
kombucha
hard seltzer

4 oz to 1.5 liters 
Any beverages other than the above in sizes 4 oz to 1.5 liters in metal, glass or plastic containers are subject to a 10 cent refund value. Some milk based products such as kefir, drinkable yogurt, milk-based smoothies and milk or plant-based milk with other ingredients that have been previously excluded were enrolled into the Oregon Bottle Bill in January 2020, but the OLCC reversed the decision on February 5, 2020.

exclusions to the refund value requirements 

distilled liquor, and any beverages containing distilled spirits in any amount. 
wine, including mead and hard cider over 8.5% ABV. 
milk and plant based milk
infant formula
vinegar (except drinking vinegar)
flavoring and condiments, including juices not normally drunk without mixing, like lemon and lime juice
concentrates and syrup
meal replacements

Senate Bill 1520 (canned wine) 
2022 expansion to Oregon Bottle Bill added canned wine, which will carry a refund value starting on July 1, 2025.

Deposit redemption

Bag drop off redemption 
In this redemption method, consumers create an account and fill designated bags with empty containers and drop off the filled bags to a participating location. They're collected and taken to a processing center and refund value is credited to the consumer's account after they have been counted. Drop locations are not staffed. The redemption operator OBRC is rated "F" by the Better Business Bureau as of November 2020 for having 64 complaints and 3 unanswered complaints. State audit reported that consumers have complained about accuracy of the counting process, but found the program generally works well. The audit identified an instance where the OBRC incorrectly counted against a usage quota and commented that they were unable to identify where discrepancy came from due to account only shows the current balance without revealing credit for each bag.

Concerns around fraudulent conduct

Theft from curbside bins and receptacles 
It is unlawful under Oregon Revised Statutes 459A.080 to remove recyclable containers set aside for collection by a city or county collection service without the permission of the owner or generator of the contents, which includes going through curbside bins for containers with deposit value. It is also unlawful to remove recyclable material from a container, box, vehicle, depot or other receptacle for the accumulation or storage of recyclable material without permission of the receptacle's owner.  Violation of ORS 459A.080 is a class A misdemeanor criminal offense per ORS 459.992(1)(d) In the Oregon Supreme Court case State v. Waterhouse,defendant, a scrapper, was found guilty of intentionally appropriating scrap metal having some value to himself.

Issues attributed to refundable container thefts 

In December 2018, The Columbian reported neighbors in the Cascade Park neighborhood in Vancouver, Washington near the Oregon border have noticed thefts of cans and bottles as well as the curbside bins. A district manager for Waste Connections reported its subsidiary Columbia Resource Company that handles Clark County, Washington saw a 9% reduction in glass bottles returned after the deposit increased from 5 cents to 10 cents in Oregon in 2017. He attributes the likely cause to theft. Removal of contents from recycling bins or nearby them without the consent of the generator or the hauler is prohibited in Clark County. Waste Connections did not provide an exact number on thefts from recycling bins, but reported enough is removed and taken to Oregon to have a financial impact for Waste Connections which sells recyclable materials collected. The Columbian reported in June 2019 that reports of scavengers rummaging through recycling bins have increased in the past year. The newspaper reports scavengers target cans and bottles that have value across the Columbia river which undercuts the hauler as well as generating complaints from the public. Marty Smith, writing for the Willamette Week reports that community members in Vancouver started complaining about theft of cans and bottles from their recycling bins. To better track complaints related to recyclables scavenging, the Clark Regional Emergency Services Agency (CRESA), the police dispatch for Clark County is looking into a way of tracking scavenging complaints. In Washington state, scavenging is a crime of third degree theft. According to the city of Vancouver, scavenging is considered by law enforcement to be a gateway crime to other crimes such as illegal drugs and identity theft.

A video on the internet showing a woman dumping water into the sink at the BottleDrop redemption center in 2017 caused a community outrage and resulted in the woman being cited for theft of $40 worth of bottled water from Albertsons. Police commented that as she was seen cashing stolen goods, it could be a felony.

In a 2018 concession stand burglary at Douglas McKay High School in Salem, burglars emptied out about ten cases of 24-pack  beverages into a trash can inside the concession stand and stole the empty containers. School staff believed the theft motive was converting the stolen containers into cash at the nearby OBRC BottleDrop redemption center on Lancaster Drive.

In September 2019, Recology, a waste hauler operating in Ashland told the Ashland Tidings that in addition to theft, its drivers were experiencing harassment by emboldened recyclables thieves that they had to improvise plans to deal with theft and harassment of drivers by thieves.  Recology receives many calls from customers concerning people going through their bins. The company recommends people to not put out their redeemables, donating them to charities or redeeming them themselves to reduce this problem.

Oregon DEQ survey reports over half of 77 multi-family property managers interviewed identified the use of waste collection area by non-tenants, such as transients, a problem that cause issues such as contamination of recyclable materials. Oregon DEQ opined retrieval of returnable containers as the motivation for transients and other non-tenants to access the collection areas.

Redemption of previously redeemed containers 
Jules Bailey, the chief stewardship officer for OBRC, told the Mail Tribune there have been instances of people attempting to redeem cans that have already been redeemed through a machine.

Fraudulent redemption of out-of-state containers 
Redemption of out-of-state containers is considered a fraud and prohibited by the bottle bill. Retailers and redemption centers may refuse to accept containers when they have reasonable grounds to believe they were purchased outside of Oregon. Staff at some locations near the state border request receipts proving the containers being redeemed were purchased in Oregon. Fraudulent redemption has been a problem according to KATU news. As told to KATU reporter by a coop (OBRC) representative, the redemption center staff at Delta Park near the state boundary catches about 50 people per day from Washington. C-TRAN which operates public transit service that traverses between Vancouver, Washington and Portland have banned the carrying of empty beverage containers on their service for safety and sanitation reasons created by people who carry cans across the state line on their service to redeem them in Portland. Jules Bailey speaking on behalf of the OBRC states he does not know the magnitude of the problem, but that it is mostly an issue with Washington containers around the Columbia corridor and minimal issues with California or Idaho. Senate Bill 522 sponsored by senator Betsy Johnson from Scappoose fines those who bring out-of-state containers. She told KGW "retail grocers in her district every day are overwhelmed with massive bottle returns from the Washington side of river, sometimes by the pickup load." At the public hearing referenced in the KGW article, the store director for Saint Helens, Safeway testified to the committee that he's seen a dramatic increase in Washington residents returning containers and described that people arrive in Washington plate vehicles with cases of bottled water and emptying them out on the parking lot to prepare the bottles to return into bottle machines at the Safeway location he manages. Northwest Grocery Association's president reported redemption rates at redemption centers near the Oregon state border have seen a sharp rise, sometimes over 100% following the deposit value increase in Oregon.

In the November 2020 State audit, the report says OBRC claims that the cost of cross-border fraud is "upwards of $10 million" however, the Oregon Secretary of State's Audits Division could not validate OBRC's claim. In preparing the report, representatives from the Audits Division visited two BottleDrop redemption centers near the Washington border and they reported observing numerous people arriving in vehicles with Washington license plates or without any plates.

Bottle deposit motivated welfare fraud "water dumping" 

"Water dumping" is a term dubbed by the United States Department of Agriculture referring to a commonly perpetrated welfare fraud by cash seeking welfare recipients purchasing bottled water so they can empty them out and redeem containers for the redemption value in cash. In September 2012, such scheme was not considered a fraud in Oregon. In February 2013, USDA expanded the Supplemental Nutrition Assistance Program fraud definition to include water dumping. The USDA intends to place repeat "water dumping" offenders on the nationwide lifetime SNAP ban list. In August 2019, KTVZ shared a video recorded by a grocery store employee in La Pine of a man dumping contents of soda that had been purchased with Oregon Trail SNAP card. According to the statement provided to the reporter by the employee, it was a common occurrence. Oregon Department of Human Services told KTVZ that it is considered a fraud that may result in a termination of benefits and the state is cracking down on this fraud this year. Springfield police observed a man and woman emptying bottles in September 2019. When contacted, the woman admitted to police they were emptying water they had purchased on SNAP to cash the containers so they can use the money to purchase fuel. The woman was arrested on outstanding warrants and the police reported the water dumping incident to the Oregon Department of Human Services. KTVL reports a store manager they interviewed has seen people purchasing bottled water with SNAP, emptying them out and returning to the store to redeem the containers for cash.

Community concerns regarding beverage container redemption centers (BCRC)  
In order to open a redemption center, it must be approved by OLCC. A site was proposed at southwest 17th Avenue and west Burnside Street in Portland in 2014. OLCC received about 200 comments, most of which were against the center. Stakeholders such as dozens of neighbors and businesses including Portland Timbers and Portland Thorns FC opposed the establishment of the beverage container redemption center. Many objections related to foresight of vagrants and crime related to transients with shopping carts with scavenged cans flocking to the new redemption center.

Beaverton 
A redemption center opened up in May, 2017 in Beaverton. KATU's Andrew Reed reports neighbors report BottleDrop brought in people "who routinely act suspicious and are causing problems" in the neighborhood. A nearby veterinarian interviewed reports BottleDrop "brought a wave of problems to his property". He reports one of his business' security camera was ripped off and had someone break into his practice' bathroom to use drugs. In addition, he reports shopping carts getting left on his property almost daily as well as finding bottles of urine; offering a list of issues of security, noise, odor, traffic, littering, drug paraphernalia and transients. A resident behind the redemption center reported seeing public urination and became suspicious of people he believes to be acting suspiciously near his home. The dean of students for Jesuit High School commented "Our school is less safe now" referring to the presence of OBRC's BottleDrop redemption center. Supporters of the center were the Oregon Food Bank which participates in its fundraising program and two science teachers from Meadow Park Middle School, which is approximately four miles from the site.

Bend 
In September 2017, KTVZ described that  businesses near the Bend BottleDrop Center have "noticed a difference in the neighborhood ever since the Bottle Drop moved in". The news reporter described businesses have seen transient encampments nearby and felt the BottleDrop attracts transients. In 2017, Bend police responded to 270 calls at the BottleDrop. In four months period leading up to when the story was written on July 16, 2018, two subjects were arrested for offensive littering and 11 were arrested for drug offenses at the BottleDrop property. Bend Police arrested 24 people in 4-months period leading up to July 12, 2018 around the BottleDrop for matters such as drug possession, stealing shopping carts from retailers and offensive littering. In April 2020, Bend Police again identified the area around Bend BottleDrop as a site of ongoing complaints about drug use, theft, littering, abandoned shopping carts and criminal mischief and conducted a focused enforcement operation resulting in several arrests.

Medford 
In June 2018, Damian Mann of Mail Tribune reports nearby business owners say the OBRC's redemption center has been a " magnet for methamphetamine "tweakers" who cash in their bottles and head out to buy drugs and "unsavory behavior". These Medford businesses also said they began noticing vagrancy, theft and vandalism ever since BottleDrop redemption center opened. In 2018, the owner of Southern Oregon Crane in Medford testified to the city council "It’s like living right next to a crack house." in reference to the redemption center. The Medford redemption center opened in November 2014 and it was the 10th one to open in the state.

Portland Delta Park 

On March 27, 2020, Delta Park BottleDrop's landlord TMT Development issued a notice of default citing health and safety concerns. After a long line started to form outside the store, TMT states BottleDrop has not been managing social distancing requirements relating to COVID-19 pandemic. The notice directed them to comply with 6 ft social distancing rule or face eviction. The same weekend, the police were called to the redemption center after a man made death threats. TMT Development's CEO says nearby businesses have complained about BottleDrop's patrons blocking their doors, standing too close together as well as violence, according to The Oregonian. In April, TMT development installed a fence around a grassy property after drug needles were found. TMT has also deployed armed guards to prevent people from queuing up in the parking lot or in front of other businesses.  This area has been used by BottleDrop's customers, but it is not part of the formal lease agreement. TMT's president cites they needed to step in to prevent fights and drug dealing. The manager of a sporting goods store interviewed by Willamette Week said he's seen drug deals and fights in front of the OBRC's BottleDrop.

Retailer requirements 
Retailers are required to refund deposit to consumer when they present containers as set forth by the bottle bill. The requirements are dependent on if the store is under 5,000 square foot; or greater than or equal to 5,000 square feet, distance from the redemption center, and the retailer's participation in the program.

Reverse vending machines are optional. Retailers are required to accept containers all hours they are open for business whether or not they have a machine or if their machine is working and being busy is not an exception to this obligation. Retailers are required to accept crushed or damaged containers if the brand and Oregon 10c marking are visible and customers are entitled to ask for a hand count on containers that have a refund value but do not go through the store's machine.

Situations when returns can be refused 
Retailers and redemption centers may refuse containers contaminated with anything other than ordinary dust, the original contents or water. Additionally, when staff have reasonable grounds to suspect the containers were not purchased in Oregon. Redemption centers use individuals arriving in a vehicle with Washington license plates as a reasonable ground to suspect they were purchased outside Oregon unless they can prove the beverages were purchased in Oregon. If there are reasonable such grounds, retailers may request a receipt. The OLCC says retailers should reject containers that have been flattened by a reverse vending machine as it is an indication that they have already been redeemed. OLCC describes cans that have already been through the machine are characterized by "small square indentations or perforations and will be fairly symmetrically crushed" and plastic bottles will have a crushed neck.

Over 5,000 square feet 
Participating retailers over 5,000 square feet within two miles (zone 1) from a redemption center are not required to accept any container. If in zone 2 (up to  miles from center), they are required to accept 24 per person, per day. Retailers outside of the zone are required to accept 144. Retailers within the zone that choose not to participate in the redemption center program are required to accept 350 containers per person per day.

Under 5,000 square feet 
They're required to accept 24 containers per person per day if they're within either zone 1 or zone 2 of the redemption center.

Retailers under 5,000 square feet (small shop, convenience stores and like) outside the two zones are allowed to limit the quantity to 50 containers per person per day. They can also limit them to the brand and size they sell.

Within these limitations, retailers are required to accept containers all hours they're open for business and it is unlawful for retailers to refuse containers unless:
 Containers are damaged to the extent that the brand cannot be readContaminated with anything other than ordinary dust, water or contents.

Bottle return machines are provided for retailers' convenience. Even when machines are broken, retailers continue to have legal obligations to accept containers even if they have to hand count them.

Redemption value flow 
State law mandates a payment of redemption value upon presentation of container. Deposit initiator is not required and charging deposit to consumers is voluntary. Bottle deposit is generally initiated by distributors and charged on each transaction. Covered products sold within the State of Oregon must read "OR 10c" for compliance purposes. For redemption purposes, OBRC's BottleDrop service will redeem all covered containers regardless of marking. Deposit that is not redeemed is kept by distributors such as Columbia Distributing and Maletis Beverages. Willamette Week'''s Nigel Jaquiss was uncertain about the environmental benefits but opined "the increase will create a big payday for the companies that distribute beer and soda." The Oregon legislature has given the OLCC the authority to enforce and administer the Bottle Bill.

In 2016, OLCC refused to release the monetary value of the deposit kept by distributors when Willamette Week asked for it. OLCC responded  "we are forbidden from releasing any numbers other than a percentage". The newspaper appealed to the Oregon Department of Justice which ordered the numbers be released as a matter of public record in September 2016. The newspaper said that the beverage industry lobbyist Paul Romain said the distributor wanted the individual companies numbers private. The data showed that distributors were keeping about $30 million annually.  OBRC had 450 employees and a budget of $44 million for 2019. During the same year, $29 million of the budget was paid for with unredeemed bottles. Remaining were paid by cash contributions from grocers and distributors.

 Returned material process 
OBRC, a group of deposit initiating distributors administers the collection and transportation of deposit bearing containers. Containers that are recycled through curbside recycling are not counted towards redemption rate statistics and waste haulers do not receive the redemption value. The value of scrap materials sold is not included in the OBRC's operating budget. OBRC distributes the revenue from selling recyclable materials to distributors that form the cooperative membership. The disbursement amount to individual cooperative member is determined based on proportion of containers and materials returned that are attributed to each member. OBRC does not release these figures to OLCC, however the state auditor's report estimated the OBRC disbursed $19.08 million in 2018 and $17.05 million in 2019 to its beverage distributor members from selling scrap materials from returned containers and most of value comes from aluminum. In August 2019; State of California listed scrap values at $1064.19/ton for aluminum, $10.33/ton for PET, and -$1.93 for glass In 2017, OBRC's expenses were $34 million. $9 million of which was paid by distributors and $25 million was paid by the unredeemed deposit.

The green bags used for BottleDrop drop off is landfilled after the contents are processed. All glass bottles that are returned for redemption under the Oregon Bottle Bill are processed at Owens-Brockway plant located in the Cully neighborhood in Portland. This plant was fined $1 million by the Oregon DEQ for environmental violations in June 2021.

 History 
Oregon's 1971 Beverage Container Act'' (ORS 459A.700 to 459A.740) was the first such legislation passed in the United States.  It went into effect on October 1, 1972.

1970s 
Before the formal 1971 Oregon Bottle Bill, Oregon had already set up a less formal bottle return system that most stores and some of the public cooperated with. Inspired by the early Vermont bottle return system before it was repealed, Oregon's limited system paid 1 cent for beer bottles and cans and 3 cents for soda bottles and cans. It was started in the mid-1950s and lasted through the rest of the 50s, throughout the 1960s and into the early 70s until the more formal and expanded Bottle Bill was enacted.  The emphasis was on bottles, as bottles were washed and re-used for fresh product sold to the public before health laws were enacted that stopped the re-wash system.  And because of the low payout for the return of bottles and cans, and in spite of various anti-litter PSA advertising campaigns on Oregon television, only a relatively small percentage of Oregonians participated in the return of bottles and cans. As a result, many bottles and cans still littered Oregon's highways and scenic areas throughout this entire early bottle-can recycling period.

Richard Chambers, a logging equipment salesman, collected litter during his hiking, climbing, and kayaking throughout the state.  In 1968, he called Oregon State Representative Paul Hanneman, whom Chambers knew well, after he was inspired by a small newspaper article about British Columbia wanting to ban non-refundable bottles and cans. Chambers wanted a deposit on bottles and cans to encourage people to return them to the store.

Chambers began a letter-writing campaign, using non-ordinary stationery and stamps to draw the attention of his intended audience.  Oregon House Bill 1157 was introduced and assigned to the House State and Federal Affairs Committee.  Chambers brought in people to testify for the bill, including a river guide to testify about the amount of beverage package litter in the water, and a farmer who lost four cows because of ingestion of glass and metal shards from beverage containers. Beverage container materials companies and bottling companies fought the bill. Hanneman offered the compromise of not banning non-returnables but instead requiring a five-cent deposit as an incentive for return. By a 5 to 4 vote, the bill was sent to the House floor, where it fell 3 votes short of passage, with 27 of 60 members voting for it. Governor Tom McCall had already offered his support for the bill, so Hanneman asked McCall to help sway the House's vote in favor of passage.  McCall refused, advising that he did not want a Bottle Bill in that legislative session.  McCall planned to endorse the anti-littering campaign espoused by the Keep America Beautiful non-profit in 1970 and wait until 1971 to support the Bottle Bill. It has been written that this delay was intentional on McCall's part to make the bill his. After its defeat, Chambers continued his letter writing campaign.

After McCall refused to back the Bottle Bill in 1969, he sponsored the formation of non-profit SOLV—Stop Oregon Litter and Vandalism.  In 1971, it was reported that 75% of SOLV's budget was derived from organizations opposing the bottle bill.  SOLV also received state funds.

In 1970, McCall initiated his own campaign for the Bottle Bill.  Bill Chambers and Don Waggoner (1935–2016) worked to get the bill approved. Among opponents of the bill were beverage companies who feared financial strains with the processing of returns.

The new bill, House Bill 1036, banned non-returnables and placed a five-cent deposit on bottles and cans containing beer, malt beverage, mineral and soda waters and carbonated soft drinks. The law went into effect on October 1, 1972. The law mandated beer, malt liquor and carbonated soft drinks in refillable containers that were certified for use by multiple manufacturers to have a minimum of 2 cent per container deposit. Those beverages in other types of containers were required to have a 5 cent refund value.

The first 6 months into the bottle bill 
Prior to the Bottle Bill becoming enacted, about 51% of soft drinks were sold in refillable glass bottles, 41% in cans and 8% in non-refillable glass bottles. In December 1971, the OLCC estimated about 35% of beer sold in Oregon were sold in cans. In December 1972, 99.5% of beer was sold in bottles with the remainder being sold in cans.

In March 1973, all soft drinks sold in Oregon were in refillable bottles, except for less than 1% that were sold in cans.

In March 1973 prices, beer cited as an example cost $1.58 for a six pack including 30 cent deposit in non-refillable containers and $1.17 for 6 in refillable bottles which included a 12 cent deposit.

In 1974, the state reported that litter of beverage containers had been by reduced by 83 percent.

1990s to present 
In 1996, voters rejected a ballot measure that would have extended the bottle bill. In 2005, Republican Party Representative Vicki Berger (daughter of Chambers) introduced another bill to extend the bottle bill, but it was defeated in the Senate.

On June 7, 2007, Governor Ted Kulongoski signed Senate Bill 707 into law, which added water bottles to the refund law. The law went into effect January 1, 2009. Of the nine states that had bottle bill laws at that time, only Maine, California, and Hawaii included water bottles.

The 2007 legislature also created a task force, charged with making recommendations for further updating of the Bottle Bill to the 2009 legislature. Updates under consideration in the late 2000s included adding products like wine and juice bottles, and increasing the refund amount from 5 cents.

The Container Recycling Institute estimates that 125 million disposable water bottles were sold in Oregon in 2005, more than the number of soft drink bottles, and the recycling rate for water bottles was 32 percent, compared with 82 percent for beer and soft drink bottles. Container Recycling Institute is a research and advocacy group in support of the bottle bill.

OLCC approved redemption centers run by distributors on an experimental basis in early 2010. Two locations were opened, one in Wood Village and another in Oregon City. By April 2017, there were 16 redemption centers. The first redemption center intended to migrate redemption activity away from retail stores opened in Wood Village in September 2010 and it included bag drop off service as well.

In 2016, the OLCC  announced that the redemption value would be increased to 10 cents from 5 cents in April 2017, the first-ever increase. The refund value has been 10 cents per container since April 1, 2017. The change was triggered by a provision of state law enacted by the legislature in 2011, which says that the redemption value must be increased to 10 cents if the return rate for containers falls below 80 percent for two consecutive years. The return rate was 64.5% in 2015 and 68.3% in 2014. The return rate is not an indication of recycling rate. Containers recycled through curbside recycling is not accounted in the return rate.

The next change came into effect in January 2018, when additional categories of beverages were required to have a deposit.

September 2019: Modification to include all kombucha and hard seltzer 3 liters and under into covered beverages. (SB 247).

January 2020: The OLCC announced the addition of 4oz to 1.5 liter sized Kefir, drinkable yogurt, milk-based smoothies and other beverages which are mostly milk or milk substitute with additions of other ingredients. Milk and plant-based milk substitutes are not covered, however, the same agency announced it was withdrawing the decision on February 5, 2020 due to the concerns caused by spilt milk in the OBRC's back-end.  In the 2018 expansion, Kefir was exempt from having a refund value.

A 2020 audit conducted by the state recommends shifting some or all of unclaimed deposit to the state. Throughout the history of Oregon Bottle Bill, these funds have been kept by the beverage industry. The 2020 Secretary of State audit recommends all or portions of unredeemed deposit to be remitted to the state for recycling or environmental program as done in all states with bottle deposit except Oregon and Iowa instead of letting OBRC keep it.

2022 expansion 
Bottle Bill was expanded in June 2022 to include wine in cans, which will become redeemable starting on July 1, 2025.

COVID-19 pandemic impact 

During a part of the COVID-19 pandemic, OLCC temporarily modified the retailer requirements several times. On March 15, 2020, OLCC allowed grocery stores to stop accepting bottle returns during the COVID-19 pandemic through at least the end of May, 2020;  The Bottle Bill reprieve was amended on May 22, so that enforcement begins two weeks after the county in which the store is located in has entered phased 1 of reopening schedule. Enforcement was re-suspended in counties that reverted to baseline phase. A modification was made to bottle bill requirements during phase 1 reopening allowing retailers that are not open 24 hours a day to limit bottle return hours to 8AM to 6PM. For retailers that are open 24 hours, they were allowed to limit to 7AM to 11PM. Bottle bill enforcement was suspended in March 2020, and again on November 18, 2020. The suspension remained in place in individual counties until COVID-19 risk category as defined by Oregon Health Authority is no longer "extreme" or "high". Enforcement resumes five days after the respective county is classified as "low" or "medium" by the Oregon Health Authority and suspension is resumed if the status reverts to high or extreme. Retailers in counties classified as "low" or "medium" were allowed to a reduce acceptance hours to 8AM to 6PM for stores that are not open 24 hours and 7AM to 11PM for stores open 24 hours.  All pandemic related variance to the Bottle Bill requirements ended on July 5, 2021.

Context 

Deposits on refillable glass bottles were the norm well before the 1930s, at which time the disposable steel beverage can began to slowly displace glass.  By 1960, almost half of U.S. beer was in cans, while only five percent of soft drinks were not in bottles.

Vermont passed the first "bottle bill" in 1953, but it only banned non-refillable bottles and did not introduce a deposit system.  It expired in 1957 after beer industry lobbying.

British Columbia enacted North America's oldest beverage deposit system in 1970.

Beverage containers constituted 58% of litter in Kentucky in 1999.
States which have adopted bottle deposits have reduced litter as much as 64%.
The container deposit system cost averages 1.53 cents per container (versus 1.25 cents for other collection systems) and are more than two and a half times more effective at recycling containers.

In 1991, Germany enacted an entirely different method which taxes manufacturers on the basis of the amount of packaging. Many German packagers now participate in the Green Dot program as a result of this.

By 1968, beer and soda companies were responsible for 173 million bottles and 263 million cans each year in Oregon.

Oregon Beverage Recycling Cooperative 
OBRC is the industry steward for the bottle bill and receives all of unclaimed deposit. It was formed in 2009 through the merger of Beverage Recyclers of Oregon and Container Recovery Inc. It represents 96% of beverage distributors in Oregon and operates the BottleDrop redemption centers and green bag program. It is the primary stakeholder of the Oregon Bottle Bill. While the OLCC oversees the bottle bill, OLCC's oversight over OBRC is limited.

See also 
Container deposit legislation in the United States
Environment of the United States

References

External links 
 State of Oregon's website about the law
30 minutes of a variety of 1967 television coverage during the Oregon Bottle Bill debates collected by the Oregon Historical Society Research Library
https://web.archive.org/web/20080910085315/http://www.deq.state.or.us/lq/pubs/factsheets/sw/ExpandedBottleBill.pdf
examples of included beverages
examples of excluded beverages

1971 in law
1971 in Oregon
1971 in the environment
Container deposit legislation
Environment of Oregon
Oregon law
Recycling in the United States
Waste legislation in the United States